Startling may refer to:

 "Pandemic 2: The Startling", an episode of South Park
 Startling Stories, an American pulp science fiction magazine 1939-1955
 Startling Music, a record label founded by Ringo Starr
 Startling Studios, a music recording studio at Tittenhurst Park

See also
 
 
 Startle (disambiguation)
 Startling Odyssey a Japanese videogame
 "Startling! Frightening! Elekid!!", an episode of Pokémon: Battle Frontier